Schwadorf is an Austrian market town in the Bruck an der Leitha district. It lies on the banks of the River Fischa, fifteen miles (25 km) southeast of Vienna.

Geography
The town is located in a seismic area above a fault line. The "Schwadorf Dome" has been subject to minor earthquakes on occasion, the last one of significance occurring on 8 October 1927.

Population

Sport
The town's football team, SK Schwadorf, was formed on 31 May 1936 (as ASK Schwadorf). They hosted English giants Arsenal in a friendly in July 2006.

Recent times
The town's former district Wien-Umgebung was dissolved at the end of 2016.

Notable people 
 Eduard Ritter von Josch (b. Schwadorf 1799), botanist, president of the regional court in Laibach.

References

Cities and towns in Bruck an der Leitha District